Hinksland is a peninsula in eastern Greenland. It is a part of the Northeast Greenland National Park.

The peninsula is named after Arthur R. Hinks, Secretary of the Royal Geographical Society, 1915–45.

Geography
Hinksland is limited to the northwest by the Daugaard-Jensen Glacier, beyond which lies Charcot Land, to the northeast by the Nordvestfjord of the Scoresby Sound and to the south by the  Flyver Fjord. To the southwest the peninsula is attached to the mainland. The Renland peninsula lies to the southeast, beyond Th. Sørensen Land and Nathorst Land to the north, across the Nordvestfjord. The highest point of the peninsula is a  mountain located in the southern part rising above the Flyver Fjord.

Geologically Hinksland is part of the Vestfjord-Hinksland gneiss and schist zone crystalline complex.

Hinksland is at the southern limit of the eastern coastal area of the Northeast Greenland National Park. Constable Point (Nerlerit Inaat) is the closest airport.

See also
Renland
Milneland

References

External links 
 A Review of Muskox Observations from North and Northeast Greenland
Greenland place names and spelling, by T. Higgins

Peninsulas of Greenland
Scoresby Sound